Dear Lover may refer to:

Dear Lover (album) by Matthew Ryan
"Dear Lover" (song) by Mary Wells